Ezekiel's Temple is an unbuilt temple structure described in the biblical Book of Ezekiel.

Details 

Features of the temple are described in detail in the book of Ezekiel, in the form of a vision given to the prophet. Physical characteristics of the multi-level wood-panelled structure such as gateways, outer and inner courts, side chambers and vestibules, archways, doors, windows, sanctuary and altar are described. Some furnishings are described. Details of decoration are given, for example cherubim and palm trees carved on the doors and walls. The purposes of the side chambers are given, for example, for robing of the priests, for consumption of the flesh of sacrifices by the priests, and for singers. Dimensions are given based on the cubit.

Commentary 
The fact that details of the temple are given in the context of a prophetic vision, gives rise to analysis and debate regarding the meaning, significance and purpose of the temple.

Jewish commentary
Maimonides called it "the temple that will be built" and qualified these chapters of Ezekiel as complex for the common reader and even for the seasoned scholar. Bible commentators who have ventured into explaining the design detail directly from the Hebrew Bible text include Rashi, David Kimhi, Yom-Tov Lipmann Heller, and Meir Leibush ben Yehiel Michal which all produced slightly varying sketches of the temple envisioned by Ezekiel.

Christian commentary
Some Christian interpretations of Ezekiel's temple are: it is the temple that Zerubbabel should have built; a literal temple to be rebuilt during the millennial reign of Christ, a temple which is symbolic of the worship of God by the Christian church today, or a symbol of the future and eternal reign of God. A number of Christian commentators also believe that this temple will be a literal Fourth Temple, which will exist during the Millennial Kingdom, following the destruction of a future temple that will be desecrated by the Antichrist.

See also 
 Third Temple
 Vidi Aquam, a Latin chant that describes the Temple in this vision

References

Further reading 
Henning, Emil Ezekiel's Temple. Xulon Press, 2013. 
Theo. G. Soares. “Ezekiel's Temple.” The Biblical World, vol. 14, no. 2, 1899, pp. 93–103. JSTOR, Ezekiel's Temple
Duguid, Iain M., "The NIV Application Commentary - Ezekiel", p. 481, Zondervan, 1999
McConville, J. Gordon, "Exploring the Old Testament: A Guide to the Prophets", pp. 101–2, IVP Academic, 2002
Ganzel, Tova, Ezekiel’s Visionary Temple in Babylonian Context, forthcoming, De Gruyter 2021. 
Chase, Neal, Ezekiel's Temple in Montana, 1991. 
Book of Ezekiel
Proposed religious places
Temples